Margherita Mazzucco (born 26 September 2002) is an Italian actress. She is best known for her performance as Elena "Lenù" Greco in the TV series My Brilliant Friend and as Chiara in Chiara.

References

External links 

2002 births
Living people
Actresses from Naples
Italian film actresses
Italian television actresses